Van Buren Township may refer to:

Arkansas

 Van Buren Township, Crawford County, Arkansas
 Van Buren Township, Newton County, Arkansas
 Van Buren Township, Union County, Arkansas

Indiana

 Van Buren Township, Brown County, Indiana
 Van Buren Township, Clay County, Indiana
 Van Buren Township, Daviess County, Indiana
 Van Buren Township, Fountain County, Indiana
 Van Buren Township, Grant County, Indiana
 Van Buren Township, Kosciusko County, Indiana
 Van Buren Township, LaGrange County, Indiana
 Van Buren Township, Madison County, Indiana
 Van Buren Township, Monroe County, Indiana
 Van Buren Township, Pulaski County, Indiana
 Van Buren Township, Shelby County, Indiana

Iowa

 Van Buren Township, Jackson County, Iowa
 Van Buren Township, Keokuk County, Iowa
 Van Buren Township, Lee County, Iowa
 Van Buren Township, Van Buren County, Iowa

Michigan

 Van Buren Township, Wayne County, Michigan

Minnesota

 Van Buren Township, St. Louis County, Minnesota

Missouri

 Van Buren Township, Newton County, Missouri, in Newton County, Missouri
 Van Buren Township, Wright County, Missouri
 Van Buren Township, Jackson County, Missouri

Ohio

 Van Buren Township, Darke County, Ohio
 Van Buren Township, Hancock County, Ohio
 Van Buren Township, Montgomery County, Ohio
 Van Buren Township, Putnam County, Ohio
 Van Buren Township, Shelby County, Ohio

See also
 Van Buren (disambiguation)

Township name disambiguation pages